Jimmy Connors defeated the defending champion John McEnroe in the final, 3–6, 6–3, 6–7(2–7), 7–6(7–5), 6–4 to win the gentlemen's singles tennis title at the 1982 Wimbledon Championships.	 The final between Connors and McEnroe was the first Wimbledon match in history that was deliberately scheduled to take place on a Sunday.

A number of high-profile players were absent from this tournament for various reasons. This included five-time champion Björn Borg, who refused to play after officials required him to play in a qualifier tournament due to being absent from the tour injured for most of 1982; Ivan Lendl and Eliot Teltscher both withdrew citing difficulty playing on the grass courts; and Argentine players Guillermo Vilas and José Luis Clerc withdrew in protest to their country's conflict with the United Kingdom over the Falkland Islands.

Seeds

  John McEnroe (final)
  Jimmy Connors (champion)
  Vitas Gerulaitis (quarterfinals)
  Sandy Mayer (third round)
  Johan Kriek (quarterfinals)
  Gene Mayer (quarterfinals)
  Mats Wilander (fourth round)
  Peter McNamara (first round)
  Andrés Gómez (first round)
  Yannick Noah (withdrew)
  Brian Teacher (quarterfinals)
  Mark Edmondson (semifinals)
  Brian Gottfried (second round)
  Roscoe Tanner (fourth round)
  Buster Mottram (fourth round)
  Steve Denton (fourth round)

Yannick Noah withdrew due to injury. He was replaced in the draw by lucky loser Richard Meyer.

Qualifying

Draw

Finals

Top half

Section 1

Section 2

Section 3

Section 4

Bottom half

Section 5

Section 6

Section 7

Section 8

References

External links

 1982 Wimbledon Championships – Men's draws and results at the International Tennis Federation

Men's Singles
Wimbledon Championship by year – Men's singles